Emergence is an American mystery-themed thriller television series created by Tara Butters and Michele Fazekas for ABC Studios. Originally intended to be produced as a potential series prospect for NBC after it had ordered a pilot, the hour-long program was picked up by ABC, which added it to its 2019–20 television schedule lineup, where it debuted on September 24, 2019, as a Tuesday night entry. In May 2020, the series was canceled after one season.

Premise
A police chief in Southold on Long Island's Peconic Bay takes in a young child whom she finds near the site of a mysterious accident, but soon discovers that the girl has no memory of what has happened or who she is. The child's mystery becomes more intense than expected when the chief starts investigating the history that led up to the accident and the questions of how and why it happened, dating back 15 years. A series of bizarre electronic disruptions, unexplained forces and a strange cryptic symbol are also at play, all of which are related to the young girl.

Cast

Main

 Allison Tolman as Jo Evans, a newly divorced police chief and mother to teenage daughter Mia, who takes in the mysterious young girl Piper and is determined to protect her from those who want the child. Out of concern for Piper, she covers up any details of her existence and events, eventually taking in the girl as her foster daughter. 
 Alexa Swinton as Piper, a young girl with unique powers. She was the sole survivor of the plane crash, whom Jo takes in and is the center of the mystery that is tied to her. She is later revealed to be an artificially intelligent gynoid who was part of a project involving placing artificial children with families. Piper is extremely dangerous and self-evolving, but at the same time wants to be loved and wanted. She is also the "blueprint" of Emily Cox when she was Piper's age, and soon discovered her true identity after her code was rewritten.
 Owain Yeoman as Benny Gallagher, a man claiming to be an investigative journalist who works for Reuters, and was investigating Augur Industries, the company involved in the conspiracy centered around Piper's existence, using his sources and contacts while acting as Jo's ally. He is concerned about Jo in regards to Piper, fearing that Jo's maternal instincts blind her to Piper's true nature. Benny is also found to have some startling similarities to Piper.
 Ashley Aufderheide as Mia Evans, Jo's daughter and Piper's foster sister, whom she bonds with, especially after learning of Piper's powers. She was originally named Bree in the pilot.
 Robert Bailey Jr. as Chris Minetto, a police officer under Jo, who conspires with her to keep the information about the events secret. He later learns about Piper after Jo tells him.
 Zabryna Guevara as Dr. Abby Fraiser, a pediatrician (with psychology expertise) and Jo's best friend.
 Donald Faison as Alex Evans, Jo's concerned ex-husband, Mia's father, and a civil engineer with a talent for deciphering and decoding information. He is laid off by new owner Augur Industries as revenge for Jo's investigation of the company and its owner Richard Kindred. He is fearful of Piper being around Mia after learning the truth from Jo, but soon comes to embrace her.
 Clancy Brown as Ed Sawyer, an ex-firefighter, Jo's father, and Mia's grandfather who is also battling cancer as a result of being a first responder involved in the September 11 attacks.

Recurring

Terry O'Quinn as Richard Kindred, a ruthless multi-billionaire and head of Augur Industries, a tech firm with a mysterious and very secret agenda, who with Alan helped steal the AI technology that lead to the creation of Piper. He is revealed to be the estranged father of Emily Cox, who has him killed while he is in jail.
Maria Dizzia as Emily Cox, an AI researcher at Augur Industries. Piper looks like her as a child, as she was her original creator using stolen technology. She is terrified of the consequences of Augur's experiments and reveals to Jo and Benny the truth about Piper. Jo keeps Emily "off the grid" by offering protection in exchange for helping her. It is later revealed that she is testing Piper and wants her for herself. She is the estranged, illegitimate daughter of Richard Kindred, but her obsession with Piper results in her having him killed while he is in jail. She is later taken into custody for Richard's murder, although she continued to help Jo, and later Helen.
 Seth Barrish as Alan Wilkis, a genetics engineer who faked his own death so no one could use his life's work, fearing that AIs would eventually make humanity extinct. He and Richard were responsible for stealing the AI technology that lead to Alan's disappearance. He is later revealed to be responsible for hiring a group of fixers trying to destroy the Augur buildings, only to be double crossed by its leader, Helen, an AI who kills him.
Enver Gjokaj as Agent Ryan Brooks, an FBI agent who is also investigating Augur and of whom Jo is suspicious of because he seems to know almost everything regarding the case. When Jo tells him about the AIs, Ryan helps her despite having been taken off the case. He has fallen in love with Jo.
Rowena King as Loretta, a British scientist who is later revealed as the creator of her lookalike, Helen, a former associate of Alan and leader of an armed group of fixers called "Splinter" who have been destroying evidence and places tied to the company. Helen slashed Alan's throat believing he double crossed her, and is later revealed to have similarities to Piper, after she arranged for her kidnapping with Benny's assistance. Loretta is determined to stop Helen from replicating Piper's power by any means necessary.
Rowena King as Helen, an AI. She looks like her creator, Loretta.

Guest
Gia Crovatin and Quincy Dunn-Baker as Caitlyn and Freddie Martin, who claim to be Piper's parents but turn out to be imposters hired to abduct her. They are both killed during a car chase; after which their bodies are reduced to blood in the morgue by Ken Lerner.
Ptolemy Slocum as Ken Lerner, a fixer employed by Augur Industries who was assigned to retrieve and destroy evidence connected to Piper, such as the bodies of the Martins at the morgue. He is subsequently killed after he is captured and tells Jo about his employer.
Nikki Massoud as Lily Salgado, a social worker who helped Jo get approved to become Piper's foster mother.
Ashlie Atkinson as April, a contact of Benny's with a high level of expertise in cracking computer codes to get information (as she did with Lehman Brothers). However, she is wary of crossing potential enemies, even refusing to help Benny when she suspects he's in over his head. She is killed in a hit intended for him.
Alexis Molnar as Gwen, April's daughter, who is also a contact of Benny and, like her mother, is a hacker.
Tamara Tunie as Maria Wilkis, Alan's wife.
Dana Wheeler-Nicholson as Vanessa Cox, the estranged mother of Emily Cox.

Episodes

Production

Development
On January 11, 2019, it was announced that NBC had given Emergence a pilot order. The pilot was written by Tara Butters and Michele Fazekas, who executive produced alongside Paul McGuigan and Robert Atwood. Production companies involved with the pilot included Fazekas & Butters and ABC Studios. After the pilot was completed, NBC declined to pick up the project; however, ABC ordered it to series on May 11, 2019. A day after that, it was announced that the series would premiere in the fall of 2019 and air on Tuesdays at 10:00 P.M.

Casting
In February 2019, it was announced that Allison Tolman and Alexa Skye Swinton had been cast in the pilot's lead roles. Alongside the pilot's order announcement, in March 2019 it was reported that Owain Yeoman, Donald Faison, and Zabryna Guevara had joined the cast. On August 19, 2019, it was announced that Terry O'Quinn would join the cast in a recurring role as Richard Kindred, starting with the third episode.

Release
On May 14, 2019, ABC released the first official trailer for the series. It featured the song "Hush (feat. Garrison Starr)" by Seibold. On August 27, 2019, a 10-minute preview was made available for viewing on its official website, YouTube, and Facebook accounts. The preview also gave viewers keys to a series of clues leading up to the storyline, as reflected in the names of the episode titles.

Reception

Critical response
The review aggregator website Rotten Tomatoes reported a 94% approval rating with an average rating of 7.2/10, based on 34 reviews. The website's critical consensus reads, "Led by an outstanding Allison Tolman, Emergence avoids becoming just another mystery-box mess with strongly-written characters that will keep viewers caring no matter the resolution." Metacritic, which uses a weighted average, assigned a score of 69 out of 100 based on 14 critics, indicating "generally favorable reviews".

Los Angeles Times reviewer Robert Lloyd notes the "not unfamiliar" premise comparisons to other media, such as series Believe, Stranger Things and the films Firestarter and even E.T. What makes Emergence different, notes Lloyd, is Allison Tolman's ability to "fill the screen with thought" and almost single-handedly transform Emergence "from a decent genre show into something richer." Subsequently, Lloyd picked the program as one of the best new shows on television in his 2019 year-end review.

Ratings

References

External links

2010s American crime drama television series
2010s American mystery television series
2019 American television series debuts
2020 American television series endings
2020s American crime drama television series
2020s American mystery television series
American Broadcasting Company original programming
American fantasy drama television series
American fantasy television series
American thriller television series
English-language television shows
Science fantasy television series
2010s American supernatural television series
2020s American supernatural television series
Television series about artificial intelligence
Television series about robots
Television series by ABC Studios
Television shows filmed in New Jersey
Television shows set in New York (state)